The Kinonjeoshtegon First Nation is a band of Chippewa Indigenous Peoples in the Interlake Region of Manitoba. The Reserves associated with this band are Jackhead 43 and Jackhead 43A.
Jackhead has a population of 600. The on-reserve the population is under 200.

References 

 Kinonjeoshtegon First Nation

External links
 by ChiefDaveTraverseF&searchGeocode=4619061&layerSelected=csd&searchTheme=GeoCode&searchPass=2&boundaryType= Map of Jackhead 43 at Statcan

Interlake Reserves Tribal Council
First Nations governments in Manitoba